Bethany Township may refer to:

 Bethany Township, Michigan
 Bethany Township, Harrison County, Missouri
 Bethany Township, Iredell County, North Carolina

See also
Bethany (disambiguation)